Alexandra Schegoleva (born 6 July 2001) is a Cypriot swimmer. She competed in the women's 200 metre breaststroke event at the 2017 World Aquatics Championships. In 2019, she won three silver medals at the 2019 Games of the Small States of Europe held in Budva, Montenegro.

References

2001 births
Living people
Cypriot female swimmers
Place of birth missing (living people)
Swimmers at the 2018 Summer Youth Olympics
Female breaststroke swimmers